Spokane Transit Authority, more commonly Spokane Transit or STA, is the public transport authority of central Spokane County, Washington, United States, serving Spokane, Washington, and its surrounding urban areas.

Originally conceived in 1980, and authorized by voters on March 10, 1981, STA provides public transportation within the Spokane County Public Transportation Benefit Area (PBTA).

It began operating service in 1981 after acquiring the assets of the city-operated Spokane Transit System. The agency can trace its roots to a number of private transit operators extending back to 1888. While the 98th largest metropolitan area in the United States, Spokane ranks 20th in transit ridership per capita using 2019 ridership data.

Services 

Spokane Transit provides multiple services:
 Fixed Route Bus Service.  Spokane Transit operates 43 bus routes throughout its service area on published schedules. Most routes run 365 days a year. Additionally, STA operates routes during major community events such as the Lilac Bloomsday Run.
 Paratransit.  Pursuant to the Americans with Disabilities Act of 1990, Spokane Transit provides accessible transportation to persons with disabilities within  of every fixed route.
 Vanpool.  A service which matches people traveling to or from similar locations and provides a publicly owned van at a fixed price per mile.

Fixed routes 

Spokane Transit has 43 fixed routes operating year-round on published schedules. Routes are numbered to reflect service class by the number of digits as described in the table below. Key geography is reflected in the first digit of regular service, while numbering of target service with triple reflects key markets and underlying geography through the combination of digits. 

Routes have distinct weekday, Saturday and Sunday schedule patterns. Major holidays operate on a Sunday schedule.

Bus rapid transit 
As of 2021, Spokane Transit is developing two bus rapid transit lines within the region as part of its planned High Performance Transit network.  The first line, the City Line, is currently under construction with a scheduled opening in July 2023 and will traverse from east–west through Downtown Spokane and the University District, running between the Browne's Addition neighborhood and the Spokane Community College Transit Center.

A second line, with a working project name of Division BRT, is currently in design and planned to run north–south through Spokane along Division Street, with a goal of starting construction in 2025 and commencing service in 2027.

Passenger facilities and amenities

Transit Centers 
Spokane Transit operates four transit centers as of May 2020:
STA Plaza, in downtown Spokane
 Pence-Cole Valley Transit Center (VTC), in Spokane Valley
 Spokane Community College Transit Center, in Chief Garry Park in East Spokane
 West Plains Transit Center, near Four Lakes

Bus Stops 
At the end of 2020, Spokane Transit served 1,610 bus stops throughout its service area.

Park and Ride Lots 

Spokane Transit operates a total of 14 park-and-ride facilities throughout its service area, several of which are operated through cooperative agreements with other property owners to allow parking access to transit services.

Bicycle Accommodation 
All fixed routes have buses with racks that can fit three bikes on the exterior of the bus. Most park and ride lots feature bike lockers that can be rented on a monthly basis. The New Flyer Xcelsior 60' articulating electric buses implemented on the City Line accommodate bikes onboard the bus via the rear doors.

Fares and passes

Fare structure 
(As of October 2022) 

As of October 2022, the standard fare costs $2.00 and permits the rider to board any route for a period of two hours from initial purchase or validation on the bus. On October 1, 2022, Spokane Transit inaugurated a new accounted-based fare collection system, known as the Connect fare system. The fare system includes online account management, a smart card known as the Connect card, and a mobile app, STA Connect. The new system caps fares collected on a daily and monthly basis and includes several discount programs . A "Rider's License" allows youth ages 6-18 to ride with zero fare. Traditional fareboxes remain on all fixed route coaches, allowing riders to pay with cash or older media as described below.

Fare media 

As of 2021, fares on Spokane Transit can be paid in cash, or with pre-paid passes and transfers programmed to magnetic stripe cards or RFID smart cards. The fare payment platform went live on December 4, 2006, after a brief transition period from December 1 through December 3, 2006 that saw a system-wide wavier of bus fares as new fare boxes were being installed. STA's prior system, while also accepting cash, utilized paper transfers and metal coin tokens.

STA launched the Connect Card with a companion eConnect app on October 1, 2022. The fare collection system, developed by INIT, can accept the Connect Card via NFC and the mobile eConenct app; later in 2023, the system will begin to be able to accept conactless payments such as Apple Pay and Google Pay.

Pass programs 
Spokane Transit provides multiple fare instruments, including employee, youth, and college passes.  Additionally, organizations may participate in the Universal Transit Access Pass (UTAP) program with a "utility charge" for each ride taken by eligible participants. Spokane Transit currently maintains UTAP contracts with Eastern Washington University, Washington State University Spokane, Community Colleges of Spokane, Whitworth University, Gonzaga University and the University of Washington School of Medicine in Spokane (via Gonzaga University); City of Spokane for employees and elected officials; and, Spokane County for employees and elected officials.

Governance 
Spokane Transit is governed by a board of directors which includes nine positions filled by elected officials who must be appointed by the municipal jurisdictions that form the agency, and one position appointed by the Board upon recommendation by the labor organizations representing the public transportation employees within the local public transportation system pursuant to state law.

Originally, the board consisted of 2 members from the City of Spokane, 2 members from the Spokane County Commission, 1 member from each of the Cities of Airway Heights, Cheney, Medical Lake, and the Town of Millwood, and one additional member alternately held by an official from the City of Spokane and Spokane County.

The City of Liberty Lake was incorporated in August 2001, and the City of Spokane Valley was incorporated in March 2003, necessitating a change in board membership.  Now the board consists of:
 City of Spokane, 3 members
 Spokane County, 2 members
 City of Spokane Valley, 2 members
 The small cities, 2 members (combined)
 Labor representative, 1 member (non-voting)
The Board of Directors is also advised by the following committees:

 Board Operations Committee
 Planning & Development Committee
 Performance Monitoring & External Relations Committee
 Citizens Advisory Board.

The executive team for Spokane Transit Authority consists of the following positions:

 Chief Executive Officer (CEO)
 Chief Operations Officer (COO)
 Chief Financial Officer (CFO)
 Chief Planning and Development Officer
 Chief Human Resources Officer
 Chief Communication and Cusomter Service Officer

Ridership

Fixed route fleet 
As of January 2022, Spokane Transit has 167 buses in its fleet.  Included in the fleet are:

History

1880s–1970s: Predecessors 
Transit history in the Spokane area dates back more than 130 years beginning with the inaugural trip of a horse-drawn streetcar running between downtown Spokane and the Browne's Addition neighborhood to the west in 1888. The first electrically powered streetcar began operations November 1889 and traveled between downtown Spokane through what is now the University District.  Over the next several decades, multiple private interests constructed and operated streetcars and cable cars typically as an integral part of a real estate development plan.

By 1896, the leading streetcar system was the Spokane Street Railway Company, with 23 miles of railway. Its network of lines was described as a "cartwheel" that emanated from a "hub" at the intersection of Riverside Avenue and Howard Street in downtown Spokane.

By 1910, streetcar lines were owned and operated by two competing companies: Washington Water Power and Spokane Traction Company. In addition to urban street railways, each company had interests in electric Interurban lines that stretched as far away as Moscow, Idaho. In that year, streetcar and interurban ridership peaked at 37.98 million rides.

The decade following 1910 was a time of intense competition for the streetcars, with growing automobile ownership and private jitneys that threatened the viability of a divided transit system. By the end of the decade, Spokane Traction Company fell into receivership and underwent reorganizations that were unsuccessful in returning the system to profitability. In 1922, Spokane citizens overwhelmingly voted to amend the city charter to reduce taxes and other special assessments imposed on streetcar operations and infrastructure, enabling the formation of a unified streetcar system featuring "universal transfers" between lines and empowering the company to convert some lines to trolleybuses on its own discretion. Following the successful measure, the Spokane United Railway Company was formed as a subsidiary to Washington Water Power (later, Avista Corporation), creating a unified electric streetcar system.

The street railway system was gradually phased out through the 1930s to make way for motorized coaches.  Bus ridership reached a peak in the Spokane area in 1946 with 26 million passengers. The system was purchased by Spokane City Lines Company (part of National City Lines) in 1945, and later turned over to the City of Spokane in 1968.  Upon acquisition by the city, funding for the system was derived from a $1 household tax.

1980s: Reorganization into regional system 
In 1980, a municipal corporation was created to administer mass transit services for a new public transportation benefit area (PTBA).  The new PTBA represented a shift in funding and operational model of Spokane Transit System from a city model to a regional model.  Due to rapid inflation in the late 1970s and early 1980s, the flat $1 city tax on households that had funded Spokane Transit System was no longer keeping up with the rising costs of its era.  The household tax model had another major disadvantage; because the tax depended on the quantity of households within the tax boundaries, its revenues would only increase with the construction of new households.  Meanwhile, most residential growth was occurring outside Spokane city limits.  Furthermore, the flat tax on households had been viewed by some as a very regressive tax.

An election was held on March 10, 1981, to determine the future of public transportation in the Spokane region.  The election measure, which passed and was subsequently implemented the following month of April 1981, replaced the $1 tax on households within Spokane city limits with a 0.3% sales tax to be applied throughout the public transportation benefit area.  The shift in the transit agency's funding and administrative model was not isolated to Spokane.  Many other cities and regions in Washington state including the cities of Vancouver and Tacoma, as well as King County, Pierce County, Snohomish County, and Clark County had already shifted from a city household tax model to a county-wide transit system funded by sales tax.

In addition to adapting its funding model to reflect the current economic times, the shift to a regional model allowed the transit agency to heavily increase bus service to areas beyond Spokane city limits.  Prior to the election, service outside city limits was scarce, despite the areas already falling within the public transportation benefit area.

The restructured system operated under three branches; Spokane Transit Authority for Regional Transportation (START) was the administrative body, the Spokane Transit System (STS) name remained for the fixed route bus operation, and Spokane Area Special Transportation Agency (SASTA) operated the paratransit services.  The three names were unified about one and half years later in September 1982 under the Spokane Transit Authority name and brand. The name change officially took effect on September 23, 1982, after the START Board passed a resolution renaming the municipal corporation to Spokane Transit Authority.

1990s 
At the urging of the downtown business community, Spokane Transit built a transit center in 1995 to replace the historic Howard and Riverside hub which required that buses park along many downtown streets for passengers to make transfers. Not only was this uncomfortable for passengers, who were forced to wait for buses in the weather, but it also made the streetside businesses less accessible to customers. The bus center, known as "The Plaza" was constructed as an indoor urban park at a cost of approximately $20 million including property acquisition costs. With its high, daylight ceiling, imported Italian tile, and cougar statues leaping over a waterfall between the up- and down- escalators, it generated great controversy.

In September 1998, Spokane Transit implemented a major revision of the bus network, the largest change to the bus network in 17 years. Routes were consolidated to provide more frequency on busy corridors and all route numbers were revised, primarily according to geography. 

In addition to the local sales tax, a major revenue source was Washington State's motor vehicle excise tax which provided matching funds.  After statewide Initiative I-695 was passed in 1999, the legislature eliminated the matching funds even though the initiative was later found unconstitutional.

2000s 

The period after the elimination of the motor vehicle excise tax was a time of unprecedented change for Spokane Transit.  As its undesignated cash reserves balance fell, Spokane Transit attempted to increase its tax authority from 0.3% to 0.6% in September 2002, but it was rejected by voters 48% to 52%.

Spokane Transit created task force to study changes that could be made to regain the support of the community, while simultaneously preparing for a potential 40% service decrease.  After increased public participation, and 69% voter approval, Spokane Transit increased the sales tax from 0.3% to 0.6% in October 2004, subject to a sunset of the tax in 2009.  In May 2008, voters reauthorized the additional 0.3% sales tax with no sunset clause.

SRTC and STA jointly created the Light Rail Steering Committee (LRSC) in early 2000 which was responsible for studying the creation of a light rail corridor from downtown Spokane to Liberty Lake.  This effort was preceded by significant study by the SRTC. In 2006 the committee published a Draft Environmental Impact Statement (DEIS) which evaluated several rail and bus alternatives for the corridor. The committee stated preference for a single-track rail corridor using diesel multiple units (DMU) that would cost less than half the conventional light rail system. The travel demand modeling performed as part of the DEIS forecast less than 3,500 daily boardings on the 15.5-mile system in 2025. An advisory vote in 2006 elicited a negative response to continued planning and investment in the light rail project.

In 2008, transit consultants Nelson-Nygaard Associates recommended changes to transit operations downtown while retaining the use of the Plaza transfer facility.

2010s 
Spokane Transit adopted a new comprehensive plan, Connect Spokane, in June 2010, to guide system planning and growth. The plan calls for a network of high performance transit with frequent service connecting key neighborhoods and activity centers throughout the region.

In response to a significant decline in sales tax revenue resulting from the Great Recession, Spokane Transit undertook service reductions in 2010 and 2011.
Despite the cuts, ridership increased, reaching an all-time high for Spokane Transit Authority in 2014, with 11.3 million passengers on its fixed route system.

In 2016, voters approved an increase in the sale tax dedicated to public transit to implement the STA Moving Forward plan. The plan called for more and better service, new connection facilities, include new transit centers and stations, and investments in six high performance transit lines.

In 2018, Spokane Transit opened the West Plains Transit Center, an investment of the STA Moving Forward plan. The addition of the transit center allows passengers between the cities of Cheney, Medical Lake and Airway Heights to travel between those cities without transferring in Spokane at the STA Plaza. As part of the 2018 changes, STA also increased frequency on service to the West Central neighborhood, introduced larger buses on North Division Street and introduced a new express route to the Valley Transit Center.

2020s 
Like public transport agencies across the globe, STA was significantly impacted by the COVID-19 Pandemic. Fixed route ridership dropped from 9.97 million passenger boardings in 2019 to 5.24 million passenger boardings in 2021. STA's ridership began to recover in 2022, with May 2022 experiencing a year-over-year increase of 29.6% on fixed route, 38.7% on Paratransit and 37.0% increase  on Vanpool. In October 2022, STA launched a new fare colelction system which allows for mobile payments in addition to previous payment menthods, as well as introuced fare capping.

In July 2023, STA is expected to launch City Line, the organization's first bus rapid transit line.

Planned developments 
Spokane Transit participates in regional transportation and land use planning activities.  It is a member jurisdiction of the Spokane Regional Transportation Council (SRTC), and sends a member of its board to serve on SRTC's board.

High Performance Transit Network 

In 2010, STA developed a preliminary proposal for what it calls a "High Performance Transit Network" (HPTN) composed of 14 corridors of premium all-day frequent transit service. The preliminary proposal does not specify the operating modes for each corridor but suggests that the corridors will operate at a speed appropriate to the access provided and urban characteristics of the operating environment. The HPTN vision is an element of the agency's proposed comprehensive plan, referred to as "Connect Spokane."

Also in 2010, STA and the City of Spokane initiated an alternatives analysis to study transit improvements in and around the downtown core. This "central city transit alternatives analysis" will look at "High Performance Transit" improvements that can be made to increase mobility and stimulate in-fill development. The timeline for the study calls for a "locally preferred alternative" to be determined by early 2011.

In 2016, the central city transit plan took the form as the Central City Line project, later named the City Line, a bus rapid transit line that is planned to open in 2023.  It will be the first phase of a number of high performance transit lines in Spokane and is the region's first bus rapid transit corridor.

The future Division Street BRT, running from downtown Spokane to the north end of the city, would be the second BRT corridor in the area. In March 2022, the Washington State Transportation Budget passed to accelerate the timeline of the North Spokane Corridor (NSC) freeway by two years, from 2029 opening to 2027. While STA had planned to launch the new route of 60-foot articulating electric buses in 2029 along with the NSC, the state budget also allocated $50 million to get the Division Street bus rapid transit route started early.

References

External links 

 Spokane Transit site
 Spokane Regional Transportation Council
 Local Sales Tax Change Notices – Department of Revenue: Washington State

Transportation in Spokane, Washington
Bus transportation in Washington (state)
Transit agencies in Washington (state)